José Lorenzo Sartori (24 May 1932 – 2 October 2018) was an Argentine Roman Catholic bishop.

Sartori was born in Argentina and was ordained to the priesthood in 1956. He served as bishop of the Roman Catholic Diocese of San Roque de Presidencia Roque Sáenz Peña, Argentina, from 1994 to 2008.

Notes

1932 births
2018 deaths
21st-century Roman Catholic bishops in Argentina
20th-century Roman Catholic bishops in Argentina
Roman Catholic bishops of San Roque de Presidencia Roque Sáenz Peña